Wien Neêrlands bloed (Those in whom Dutch blood) was the national anthem of the Netherlands between 1815 and 1932.

History

At the foundation of the Kingdom of the Netherlands in 1815, it was decided that a national anthem was needed. The song "Het Wilhelmus" – which is the national anthem today – was already well known in the time of the Dutch Republic. At that time, however, it was more of a party or faction hymn than a national one, being associated with and glorifying the House of Orange – which in the politics of the 17th and 18th century Netherlands had enthusiastic supporters but also bitter foes. In particular, the Wilhelmus was unpopular with the anti-Orangist Patriot party, which dominated the country (under French tutelage) for a considerable time.

Following the fall of Napoleon, with the House of Orange attaining the status of monarchs, which they lacked before, they desired to make a fresh start and adopt a politically neutral hymn rather than what had been their factional song. Moreover, a new song might also be acceptable to the Catholic inhabitants of the Southern Netherlands with which the Dutch were united in 1815 to form the United Kingdom of the Netherlands; the Wilhelmus might be interpreted as expressing Calvinist sentiments.

A competition was accordingly organized by Admiral Jan Hendrik van Kinsbergen which was won by the Dutch poet Hendrik Tollens (1780–1856) with his poem Wien Neerlandsch bloed ..., which, after some failed attempts by less gifted composers, was set to music by Johann Wilhelm Wilms (1772–1847), a Dutch-German expatriate living in Amsterdam. 

There were two versions: the original, and a changed version created for the reign of Queen Wilhelmina. The latter modernized the language, adapted the text to the fact there was now a queen instead of a king and also replaced the controversial second line van vreemde smetten vrij ("free from foreign taint").

Despite the adoption of the new anthem, Het Wilhelmus remained popular and was played at the investiture of Queen Wilhelmina in 1898.

Wien Neêrlands bloed was officially replaced by Het Wilhelmus on 10 May 1932, although it remained in use by the Royal Netherlands Navy and Army until 1939. The replacement had much to do with the fact the "new" 1815 anthem had become even more controversial than the Wilhelmus had been, with Socialists refusing to sing it.

Lyrics

Original version

The changed version

Official Versions
The national anthem had two official versions. The original version which was in use from 1815 to 1898 was written to honor a king. The second version which was in use from 1898 to 1932 was rewritten and used to honor Queen Wilhelmina.

Version used from 1815 to 1898

Version used from 1898 to 1932

References

Historical national anthems
Dutch anthems
European anthems
National anthem compositions in A major